Spiko Çuri (born 30 November 1953) is an Albanian footballer. He played in one match for the Albania national football team in 1973.

References

External links
 

1953 births
Living people
Albanian footballers
Albania international footballers
Place of birth missing (living people)
Association football forwards
Flamurtari FC players